Sadıq Asəf oğlu Sadıqov (born November 9, 1965 in Naxçıvan) is the President of the Neftchi Baku PFK since December 2009.

Career
In 1990 graduated Azerbaijan Polytechnic Institute named after Ch. Ildyryma, in mechanics department. He is executive director of the Sports Health Complex of Neftchi, Executive Member of the National Olympic Committee, Honorary Figure of Physical Culture and Sports. As of December 2009, he is the president of the Neftchi.

References

External links
Sadıq Sadıqov

People from the Nakhchivan Autonomous Republic
Living people
1965 births
Azerbaijan Technical University alumni
Neftçi PFK